The Ottawa City Council is the governing body of the City of Ottawa, Ontario, Canada. It is composed of 24 city councillors and the mayor. The mayor is elected at large, while each councillor represents wards throughout the city. Council members are elected to four-year terms, with the last election being on October 24, 2022. The council meets at Ottawa City Hall in downtown Ottawa. Much of the council's work is done in the standing committees made up of sub-groups of councillors. The decisions made in these committees are presented to the full council and voted upon.

Standing Committees

 Agriculture and Rural Affairs Committee
 Community and Protective Services Committee
 Debenture Committee
 Environment Committee
 Finance and Economic Development Committee
 Audit Sub-Committee 
 Governance Renewal Sub-Committee
 Information Technology Sub-Committee
 Member Services Sub-Committee
 Planning Committee
 Built Heritage Sub-Committee
 Transit Commission
 Transportation Committee

Advisory Committees

 Accessibility
 Arts, Culture, Heritage and Recreation
 Environmental Stewardship
 French Language Services Services

2022–2026 members
 Mark Sutcliffe – Mayor

 Jessica Bradley - Gloucester-Southgate Ward
 Riley Brockington – River Ward
 David Brown - Rideau-Jock Ward
 Marty Carr – Alta Vista Ward
 Cathy Curry - Kanata North Ward 
 George Darouze – Osgoode Ward
 Steve Desroches - Riverside South-Findlay Creek Ward
 Sean Devine – Knoxdale-Merivale Ward 
 Laura Dudas - Orléans West-Innes Ward
 Glen Gower - Stittsville Ward
 David Hill – Barrhaven West Ward
 Allan Hubley – Kanata South Ward
 Laine Johnson - College Ward
 Theresa Kavanagh - Bay Ward
 Clarke Kelly – West Carleton-March Ward
 Rawlson King - Rideau-Rockcliffe Ward 
 Catherine Kitts - Orléans South-Navan Ward
 Jeff Leiper – Kitchissippi Ward
 Wilson Lo - Barrhaven East Ward
 Matthew Luloff – Orléans East-Cumberland Ward 
 Shawn Menard - Capital Ward
 Stéphanie Plante – Rideau-Vanier Ward
 Tim Tierney – Beacon Hill-Cyrville Ward
 Ariel Troster – Somerset Ward

2018–2022 members
 Jim Watson – Mayor
 Stephen Blais – Cumberland Ward (2018 - February 27, 2020)
 Riley Brockington – River Ward
 Rick Chiarelli – College Ward
 Jean Cloutier – Alta Vista Ward
 Cathy Curry - Kanata North Ward (appointed November 10, 2021)
 George Darouze – Osgoode Ward 
 Diane Deans – Gloucester-Southgate Ward
 Laura Dudas - Innes Ward
 Keith Egli – Knoxdale-Merivale Ward
 Eli El-Chantiry – West Carleton-March Ward
 Mathieu Fleury – Rideau-Vanier Ward
 Glen Gower - Stittsville Ward
 Jan Harder – Barrhaven Ward
 Allan Hubley – Kanata South Ward
 Theresa Kavanagh - Bay Ward
 Rawlson King - Rideau-Rockcliffe Ward (since 2019)
 Catherine Kitts - Cumberland Ward (since 2020)
 Jeff Leiper – Kitchissippi Ward
 Matthew Luloff – Orléans Ward 
 Catherine McKenney – Somerset Ward
 Carol Anne Meehan – Gloucester-South Nepean Ward
 Shawn Menard - Capital Ward
 Scott Moffatt – Rideau-Goulbourn Ward
 Tobi Nussbaum – Rideau-Rockcliffe Ward (2018 - January 26, 2019)
 Jenna Sudds - Kanata North Ward (2018 - September 20, 2021)
 Tim Tierney – Beacon Hill-Cyrville Ward

2014–2018 members
 Jim Watson – Mayor
 Stephen Blais – Cumberland Ward
 Riley Brockington – River Ward
 Rick Chiarelli – College Ward
 David Chernushenko – Capital Ward
 Jean Cloutier – Alta Vista Ward
 George Darouze – Osgoode Ward 
 Diane Deans – Gloucester-Southgate Ward
 Keith Egli – Knoxdale-Merivale Ward
 Eli El-Chantiry – West Carleton-March Ward
 Mathieu Fleury – Rideau-Vanier Ward
 Jan Harder – Barrhaven Ward
 Allan Hubley – Kanata South Ward
 Jeff Leiper – Kitchissippi Ward
 Catherine McKenney – Somerset Ward
 Jody Mitic – Innes Ward
 Scott Moffatt – Rideau-Goulbourn Ward
 Bob Monette – Orléans Ward 
 Tobi Nussbaum – Rideau-Rockcliffe Ward
 Shad Qadri – Stittsville Ward
 Michael Qaqish – Gloucester-South Nepean Ward
 Mark Taylor – Bay Ward
 Tim Tierney – Beacon Hill-Cyrville Ward
 Marianne Wilkinson – Kanata North Ward

2010–2014 members
 Jim Watson – Mayor
 Stephen Blais – Cumberland Ward
 Rainer Bloess – Innes Ward
 Rick Chiarelli – College Ward
 David Chernushenko – Capital Ward
 Peter D. Clark – Rideau-Rockcliffe Ward
 Diane Deans – Gloucester-Southgate Ward
 Steve Desroches – Gloucester-South Nepean Ward
 Keith Egli – Knoxdale-Merivale Ward
 Eli El-Chantiry – West Carleton-March Ward
 Mathieu Fleury – Rideau-Vanier Ward
 Jan Harder – Barrhaven Ward
 Katherine Hobbs – Kitchissippi Ward
 Diane Holmes – Somerset Ward
 Allan Hubley – Kanata South Ward
 Peter Hume – Alta Vista Ward
 Maria McRae – River Ward
 Scott Moffatt – Rideau-Goulbourn Ward
 Bob Monette – Orléans Ward
 Shad Qadri – Stittsville Ward
 Mark Taylor – Bay Ward
 Tim Tierney – Beacon Hill-Cyrville Ward
 Doug Thompson – Osgoode Ward
 Marianne Wilkinson – Kanata North Ward

2006–2010 members
 Larry O'Brien, Mayor
 Georges Bédard – Rideau-Vanier Ward
 Michel Bellemare – Beacon Hill-Cyrville Ward
 Rainer Bloess – Innes Ward
 Glenn Brooks – Rideau-Goulbourn Ward
 Rick Chiarelli – College Ward
 Alex Cullen – Bay Ward
 Diane Deans – Gloucester-Southgate Ward
 Steve Desroches – Gloucester-South Nepean Ward
 Clive Doucet – Capital Ward
 Eli El-Chantiry – West Carleton-March Ward
 Peggy Feltmate – Kanata South Ward
 Jan Harder – Barrhaven Ward
 Diane Holmes – Somerset Ward
 Peter Hume – Alta Vista Ward
 Gord Hunter – Knoxdale-Merivale Ward
 Rob Jellett – Cumberland Ward
 Christine Leadman – Kitchissippi Ward
 Jacques Legendre – Rideau-Rockcliffe Ward
 Maria McRae – River Ward
 Bob Monette – Orléans Ward
 Shad Qadri – Stittsville-Kanata West Ward
 Doug Thompson – Osgoode Ward
 Marianne Wilkinson – Kanata North Ward

2003–2006 members
 Bob Chiarelli, Mayor
 Georges Bédard – Rideau-Vanier Ward
 Michel Bellemare – Beacon Hill-Cyrville Ward
 Rainer Bloess – Innes Ward
 Glenn Brooks – Rideau-Goulbourn Ward
 Rick Chiarelli – Baseline Ward
 Alex Cullen – Bay Ward
 Diane Deans – Gloucester-Southgate Ward
 Clive Doucet – Capital Ward
 Eli El-Chantiry – West Carleton Ward
 Peggy Feltmate – Kanata Ward
 Jan Harder – Bell-South Nepean Ward
 Diane Holmes – Somerset Ward
 Peter Hume – Alta Vista Ward
 Gord Hunter – Knoxdale-Merivale Ward
 Rob Jellett – Cumberland Ward
 Herb Kreling – Orléans Ward (2003–2005)
 Jacques Legendre – Rideau-Rockcliffe Ward
 Shawn Little – Kitchissippi Ward
 Maria McRae – River Ward
 Bob Monette – Orléans Ward (2006) 
 Janet Stavinga – Goulbourn Ward
 Doug Thompson – Osgoode Ward

2001–2003 members
Bob Chiarelli, Mayor
Elisabeth Arnold, Somerset
Michel Bellemare, Beacon Hill-Cyrville
Rainer Bloess, Innes
Glenn Brooks, Rideau
Rick Chiarelli, Baseline
Alex Cullen, Bay
Diane Deans, Gloucester-Southgate
Clive Doucet, Capital
Dwight Eastman, West Carleton
Jan Harder, Bell South-Nepean
Peter Hume, Alta Vista
Gord Hunter, Knoxdale-Merivale
Herb Kreling, Orléans
Jacques Legendre, Rideau Rockliffe
Shawn Little, Kitchissippi
Phil McNeely, Cumberland (until October 2003)
Madeleine Meilleur, Rideau-Vanier (until October 2003)
Alex Munter, Kanata
Janet Stavinga, Goulbourn
Wendy Stewart, River
Doug Thompson, Osgoode

1997–2000 members
Jim Watson, Mayor
Elisabeth Arnold, Somerset
Inez Berg, Capital
Jim Bickford, Mooney's Bay Ward (April 21, 1999 - 2000)
Richard Cannings, Rideau
Diane Deans, Southgate Ward
Stéphane Émard-Chabot, Bruyère-Strathcona Ward
Allan Higdon, Alta Vista-Canterbury Ward
Karin Howard, Mooney's Bay Ward (1997 - February 3, 1999)
Ron Kolbus, Britannia-Richmond Ward
Shawn Little, Kitchissippi
Brian Mackey, Carleton Ward

1994–1997 members
Jacquelin Holzman, Mayor
Elisabeth Arnold, Somerset Ward
Richard Cannings, Rideau Ward
Diane Deans, Southgate Ward
Stéphane Émard-Chabot, Bruyère-Strathcona Ward
Allan Higdon, Alta Vista-Canterbury Ward
Karin Howard, Mooney's Bay Ward
Ron Kolbus, Britannia-Richmond Ward
Brian Mackey, Carleton Ward
Jim Watson, Capital Ward
Joan Wong, Kitchissippi

1991–1994 members
Jacquelin Holzman, Mayor
George Brown, Riverside Ward
Jill Brown, Britannia Ward
Richard Cannings, By-Rideau Ward
Alex Cullen, Richmond Ward
Peter Harris, Dalhousie Ward
Mary Hegan, Carlington-Westboro Ward (appointed; June 15, 1994 - December 1, 1994)
Diane Holmes, Wellington Ward
Peter Hume, Alta Vista Ward
Tim Kehoe, Carleton Ward
Jacques Legendre, Overbrook-Forbes Ward
Jack MacKinnon, Canterbury Ward
Mark Maloney, Carlington-Westboro Ward (1991 - June 10, 1994)
Nancy Mitchell, St. George's Ward
Joan O'Neill, Billings Ward
Jim Watson, Capital Ward
Joan Wong, Elmdale Ward

1988–1991 members
James Durrell, Mayor (1988–1991)
Marc Laviolette, Mayor (1991)
Pierre Bourque, By-Rideau Ward (Appointed March 4, 1991)
George Brown, Riverside Ward
Jamie Fisher, Elmdale Ward
Peter Harris, Dalhousie Ward (1988– September 11, 1989)*
Diane Holmes, Wellington Ward
Jacquelin Holzman, Richmond Ward
Michael Janigan, Dalhousie Ward (September 12–20, 1989; November 23, 1989 – 1991)*
Jim Jones, Britannia Ward
Tim Kehoe, Carleton Ward
George Kelly, Overbrook-Forbes Ward
Darrel Kent, Alta Vista Ward
Marc Laviolette, By-Rideau Ward (1988-Feb. 1991)
Mark Maloney, Queensboro Ward
Michael McSweeney, Canterbury Ward
Joan O'Neill, Billings Ward
Nancy Smith, St. George's Ward
Lynn Smyth, Capital Ward

* After a judge overturned the election result, a special election was held in 1989.

1985–1988 members
James Durrell, Mayor
George Brown, Riverside Ward
Jamie Fisher, Elmdale Ward
Mac Harb, Dalhousie Ward
Diane Holmes, Wellington Ward
Jacquelin Holzman, Richmond Ward
George Kelly, Overbrook-Forbes Ward
Darrel Kent, Alta Vista Ward
Marc Laviolette, By-Rideau Ward
Mark Maloney, Queensboro Ward
Michael McSweeney, Canterbury Ward
Bob Morrison, Carleton Ward
Joan O'Neill, Billings ward
Rob Quinn, Capital Ward
Nancy Smith, St. George's Ward
Ruth Wildgen, Britannia Ward

1982–1985 members
Marion Dewar, mayor
Graham Bird, Elmdale Ward
Brian Bourns, Billings Ward
Marlene Catterall, Britannia Ward
Terrance Denison, Queensboro Ward
James Durrell, Riverside Ward
Rolf Hasenack, Dalhousie Ward
Diane Holmes, Wellington Ward
Jacquelin Holzman, Richmond Ward
Toddy Kehoe, Carleton Ward
Marc Laviolette, By-Rideau Ward
Greg MacDougall, Alta Vista Ward
Michael McSweeney, Canterbury Ward
Rhéal Robert, Overbrook-Forbes Ward
Howard Smith, Capital Ward
Nancy Smith, St. George's Ward

1980–1982 members
Marion Dewar, mayor
Graham Bird, Elmdale Ward
Brian Bourns, Billings Ward
Joe Cassey, Wellington Ward
Marlene Catterall, Britannia Ward
Terrance Denison, Queensboro Ward
James Durrell, Riverside Ward
Rolf Hasenack, Dalhousie Ward
Toddy Kehoe, Carleton Ward
Darrel Kent, Canterbury Ward
Marc Laviolette, By-Rideau Ward
Greg MacDougall, Alta Vista Ward
Donald Bartlett Reid, Richmond Ward
Rhéal Robert, Overbrook-Forbes Ward
Howard Smith, Capital Ward
Nancy Smith, St. George's Ward

1978–1980 members
Marion Dewar, mayor
Donald Bartlett Reid, controller
Brian Bourns, controller
Bill Law, controller
Ralph Sutherland, controller
Georges Bédard, By-St. George's Ward
Joe Cassey, Wellington Ward
Marlene Catterall, Britannia Ward
Chris Chilton, Elmdale-Victoria Ward
Rolf Hasenack, Dalhousie Ward
Don Kay, Alta Vista Ward
Toddy Kehoe, Carleton Ward
Trip Kennedy, Queensboro Ward
Michele Mackinnon, Capital Ward
Joe Quinn, Gloucester Ward
Rhéal Robert, Rideau Ward

1977–1978 members
Lorry Greenberg, mayor
Marion Dewar, controller
Donald Bartlett Reid, controller
Pat Nicol, controller
Ralph Sutherland, controller
Georges Bédard, By-St. George's Ward
Brian Bourns, Wellington Ward
Joe Cassey, Capital Ward
Marlene Catterall, Britannia Ward
Rolf Hasenack, Dalhousie Ward
Don Kay, Alta Vista Ward
Toddy Kehoe, Carleton Ward
Trip Kennedy, Queensboro Ward
Joe Quinn, Gloucester Ward
Rhéal Robert, Rideau Ward
Roly Wall, Elmdale-Victoria Ward

1975–1976 members
Lorry Greenberg, mayor
Marion Dewar, controller
Donald Bartlett Reid, controller
Garry Guzzo, controller
Bill Law, controller
Georges Bédard, By-St. George's Ward
Brian Bourns, Wellington Ward
Sandy Boyce, Britannia Ward
Rolf Hasenack, Dalhousie Ward
Don Kay, Alta Vista Ward
Toddy Kehoe, Carleton Ward
Trip Kennedy, Queensboro Ward
Don Lockhart, Capital Ward
Pat Nicol, Elmdale-Victoria Ward
Joe Quinn, Gloucester Ward
Rhéal Robert, Rideau Ward

1973–1974 members
Pierre Benoit, mayor
Lorry Greenberg, controller
Garry Guzzo, controller
Tom McDougall, controller
Ernie Jones, controller
Joe Cassey, Wellington Ward
Marion Dewar, Britannia Ward
Don Kay, Alta Vista Ward
Gale Kerwin, Dalhousie Ward
Bill Law, Carleton Ward
Don Lockhart, Capital Ward
Jules Morin, By-St. George's Ward
Ed Mulkins, Queensboro Ward
Joe Quinn, Gloucester Ward
Rhéal Robert, Rideau Ward
Walter Ryan, Elmdale-Victoria Ward

1970–1972 members
Kenneth Hubert Fogarty, mayor (1970 - April 4, 1972)
Claude Bennett, controller (1970 - August 28, 1972)
Pierre Benoit, controller; appointed mayor April 24, 1972
Lorry Greenberg, controller
Ernie Jones, controller
Des Bender, Rideau Ward
Ralph Brunet, By Ward
Rudy Capogreco, Dalhousie Ward
Michael Cassidy, Wellington Ward (1970 - September 1, 1972)
Pat Doherty, Gloucester Ward
Garry Guzzo, Capital Ward; appointed controller May 1972 
Don Kay, Alta Vista Ward
Gale Kerwin, Dalhousie Ward
Jeffrey King, Alta Vista Ward
Bill Law, Carleton Ward
Tom McDougall, Rideau Ward; appointed controller September 5, 1972
Matt McGrath, Wellington Ward
Jules Morin, By Ward
Ed Mulkins, Queensboro Ward (1970-1972)
Joe Quinn, Gloucester Ward
Rhéal Robert, St. George's Ward
Walter Ryan, Elmdale-Victoria Ward
Charlie St. Germain, St. George's Ward
Ralph Sutherland, Carleton Ward
Harold Waddell, Queensboro Ward (1970)
Roly Wall, Elmdale-Victoria Ward
Charlotte Whitton, Capital Ward
Ken Workman, Queensboro Ward

1967–1969 members
Donald Bartlett Reid, mayor
Kenneth Fogarty, controller
Ellen Webber, controller
Murray Heit, controller
Ernie Jones, controller
Des Bender, Rideau Ward
Claude Bennett, Capital Ward
Pierre Benoit, Alta Vista Ward
Ralph Brunet, By Ward
Rudy Capogreco, Dalhousie Ward
Pat Doherty, Dalhousie Ward (1968-1969)
Maurice Egan, Carleton Ward (1967)
Lloyd Francis, Carleton Ward (1968-1969)
Lorry Greenberg, Wellington Ward (1968-1969)
Mary Harrison, Wellington Ward
Bruce Harvey, Elmdale-Victoria Ward
Howard Henry, Carleton Ward
Don Kay, Alta Vista Ward
Jim Knubley, Gloucester Ward
James McAuley, Dalhousie Ward (1967-1968)
Jules Morin, By Ward
Lionel O'Connor, Wellington Ward (1967-1968)
John Powers, Rideau Ward
Rhéal Robert, St. George's Ward
Charlie St. Germain, St. George's Ward
Joe Quinn, Gloucester Ward
Harold Waddell, Queensboro Ward
Roly Wall, Elmdale-Victoria Ward
Charlotte Whitton, Capital Ward
Ken Workman, Queensboro Ward

1965–1966 members
Donald Bartlett Reid, mayor
Kenneth Fogarty, controller
Ernie Jones, controller
Ellen Webber, controller
Murray Heit, controller
Don Armstrong, Capital Ward
Des Bender, Rideau Ward
Claude Bennett, Capital Ward
Ralph Brunet, By Ward
Pat Doherty, Gloucester Ward
Maurice Egan, Carleton Ward
Mary Harrison, Wellington Ward
Bruce Harvey, Elmdale-Victoria Ward
Howard Henry, Carleton Ward
Don Kay, Gloucester Ward
James McAuley, Dalhousie Ward
Jules Morin, By Ward
Lionel O'Connor, Wellington Ward
Cecile O'Regan, St. George's Ward
Charles Parker, Dalhousie Ward
John Powers, Rideau Ward
Charlie St. Germain, St. George's Ward
Harold Waddell, Queensboro Ward
Roly Wall, Elmdale-Victoria Ward
Ken Workman, Queensboro Ward

1963–1964 members
Charlotte Whitton, mayor
Lloyd Francis, controller (until May 20, 1963)
Donald Bartlett Reid, controller
Ellen Webber, controller
Ernie Jones, controller
Don Armstrong, Capital Ward
Des Bender, Rideau Ward
Claude Bennett, Capital Ward
Ralph Brunet, By Ward
Frank Boyce, Carleton Ward
David Dehler, St. George's Ward
Kenneth Hubert Fogarty, Queensboro Ward
Bruce Harvey, Elmdale-Victoria Ward
Murray Heit, Gloucester Ward
Howard Henry, Carleton Ward
Don Kay, Gloucester Ward
James McAuley, Dalhousie Ward
Jules Morin, By Ward (1963); Controller (May 22, 1963-1964)
Lionel O'Connor, Wellington Ward
Cecile O'Regan, By Ward (June 3, 1963-1964)
Charles Parker, Dalhousie Ward
John Powers, Rideau Ward
Bob Simpson, Wellington Ward (1963)
Ivan Sparks, Wellington Ward (1963-1964)
Charlie St. Germain, St. George's
Roly Wall, Elmdale-Victoria Ward
Ken Workman, Queensboro Ward

1961–1962 members
Charlotte Whitton, mayor
Lloyd Francis, controller 
Donald Bartlett Reid, controller
Paul Tardif, controller
Wilbert Hamilton, controller
Don Armstrong, Capital Ward
Clem Aubin, By Ward
Claude Bennett, Capital Ward
Frank Boyce, Carleton Ward
David R. Dehler, St. George's Ward
Pat Doherty, Gloucester Ward
Kenneth Hubert Fogarty, Queensboro Ward
Bruce Harvey, Elmdale-Victoria Ward
Murray Heit, Gloucester Ward
Howard Henry, Carleton Ward
James McAuley, Dalhousie Ward
Jules Morin, By Ward 
Lionel O'Connor, Wellington Ward
John Powers, Rideau Ward (1962)
Charles Parker, Dalhousie Ward
Bob Simpson, Wellington Ward
Charlie St. Germain, St. George's
Roly Wall, Elmdale-Victoria Ward
Ellen Webber, Rideau Ward
Jessen Wentzell, Rideau Ward (1961-1962)
Ken Workman, Queensboro Ward

1959–1960 members
George H. Nelms, mayor
Paul Tardif, controller
Ernie Jones, controller
Sam Berger, controller
Wilbert Hamilton, controller
Don Armstrong, Capital Ward
Clem Aubin, By Ward
Henry Bradley, Elmdale-Victoria Ward
Lon Campbell, Queensboro Ward
Lloyd Francis, Carleton Ward
Robert Groves, Rideau Ward
Murray Heit, Gloucester Ward
Howard Henry, Carleton Ward
James McAuley, Dalhousie Ward
Jules Morin, By Ward
May Nickson, St. George's Ward (1959-1960)
Lionel O'Connor, Wellington Ward
Cecile O'Regan, St. George's Ward (1960)
Charles Parker, Dalhousie Ward
Alex Roger, Gloucester Ward
Donald Bartlett Reid, Wellington Ward
George Sloan, Capital Ward
Charlie St. Germain, St. George's
Roly Wall, Elmdale-Victoria Ward
Jessen Wentzell, Rideau Ward
Ken Workman, Queensboro Ward

1957–1958
George H. Nelms, mayor
Paul Tardif, controller
Ernie Jones, controller
Wilbert Hamilton, controller
Sam Berger, controller
Clem Aubin, By Ward
Richard Barber, Queensboro Ward
Frank Boyce, Carleton Ward
Henry Bradley, Elmdale-Victoria Ward
Lon Campbell, Queensboro Ward
Pat Doherty, Gloucester Ward
Robert Groves, Rideau Ward
Howard Henry, Carleton Ward
James McAuley, Dalhousie Ward
Jules Morin, By Ward
May Nickson, St. George's Ward
Lionel O'Connor, Wellington Ward
Noel Ogilvie, Capital Ward
Charles Parker, Dalhousie Ward
Donald Bartlett Reid, Wellington Ward
Alex Roger, Gloucester Ward
George Sloan, Capital Ward
Charlie St. Germain, St. George's
Roly Wall, Elmdale-Victoria Ward
J. D. Wentzell, Rideau Ward

1955–1956
Charlotte Whitton, mayor
George Nelms, controller
Paul Tardif, controller
Roy Donaldson, controller
Ernie Jones, controller
Clem Aubin, Ward 2 (By)
Richard Barber, Ward 8 (Queensboro)
Frank Boyce, Ward 9 (Carleton)
Henry Bradley, Ward 7 (Elmdale-Victoria)
Lon Campbell, Ward 8 (Queensboro)
Pat Doherty, Ward 1 (Rideau)
James A. Donaldson, Ward 5 (Capital)
Robert Groves, Ward 1 (Rideau)
Wilbert Hamilton, Ward 6 (Dalhousie)
Howard Henry, Ward 9 (Carleton)
James McAuley, Ward 6 (Dalhousie)
Jules Morin, Ward 2 (By)
May Nickson, Ward 3 (St. George's)
Noel Ogilvie, Ward 5 (Capital)
Donald Bartlett Reid, Ward 4 (Wellington)
R. E. Robinson, Ward 4 (Wellington) (1955-1956)
Charlie St. Germain, Ward 3 (St. George's)
Roly Wall, Ward 7 (Elmdale-Victoria)
Martin M. Walsh, Ward 4 (Wellington) (January 1, 1955 - August 11, 1955)

1953–1954
Charlotte Whitton, mayor
Dan McCann, controller (1953-September 8, 1954)
Paul Tardif, controller
Roy Donaldson, controller
John Powers, controller
Clem Aubin, Ward 2 (By)
Frank Boyce, Ward 9 (Carleton)
Henry Bradley, Ward 7 (Elmdale-Victoria)
Lon Campbell, Ward 8 (Queensboro)
Robert Groves, Ward 1 (Rideau)
Wilbert Hamilton, Ward 6 (Dalhousie)
Howard Henry, Ward 9 (Carleton)
Fred Journeaux, Ward 4 (Wellington)
James McAuley, Ward 6 (Dalhousie)
Jules Morin, Ward 2 (By)
William Newton, Ward 3 (St. George's)
Noel Ogilvie, Ward 5 (Capital)
Harry Parslow, Ward 8 (Queensboro)
Alex Roger, Ward 1 (Rideau)
George Sloan, Ward 5 (Capital)
Charlie St. Germain, Ward 3 (St. George's)
Roly Wall, Ward 7 (Elmdale-Victoria)
Martin M. Walsh, Ward 4 (Wellington)

1951–1952
Grenville Goodwin, mayor (January 1, 1951 - August 27, 1951)
Charlotte Whitton, controller (1951); mayor (October 1, 1951 – 1952)
Len Coulter, controller
Dan McCann, controller
Paul Tardif, controller
Joseph Allard, Victoria Ward
Clem Aubin, Ottawa Ward
Leslie G. Avery, Rideau Ward
Frank Boyce, Carleton Ward
Henry Bradley, Elmdale Ward
Lon Campbell, Victoria Ward
Parlane Christie, Capital Ward
Pat Doherty, Gloucester Ward
Wilbert Hamilton, Dalhousie Ward
Howard Henry, Carleton Ward
Ernie Jones, Westboro Ward
Fred Journeaux, Central Ward
Cy Marshall, Central Ward (May 27, 1952 – December 31, 1952)
James McAuley, Dalhousie Ward
David McMillan, Riverdale Ward
Jules Morin, By Ward
Archibald H. Newman, Gloucester Ward
William Newton, St. George's Ward
Noel Ogilvie, Capital Ward
Charles Parker, Wellington Ward
Harry Parslow, Westboro Ward
John Powers, Rideau Ward (1951); controller (October 11, 1951 – 1952)
Eric Query, By Ward
Henri Rheaume, Ottawa Ward
Alex Roger, Rideau Ward (October 22, 1951 – 1952)
J. Grant Shaw, Central Ward (1951-April 9, 1952)
George Sloan, Riverdale Ward
Charles St. Germain, St. George's Ward
Roly Wall, Elmdale Ward
Martin M. Walsh, Wellington Ward

1949–1950
E. A. Bourque, mayor
Len Coulter, controller
Dan McCann, controller
Paul Tardif, controller
C. E. Pickering, controller
Joseph Allard, Victoria Ward
Clem Aubin, Ottawa Ward
Leslie G. Avery, Rideau Ward
Edward Band, Capital Ward
Aristide Belanger, Ottawa Ward
Frank Boyce, Carleton Ward (1950)
Henry Bradley, Elmdale Ward
Frank Ellis, Victoria Ward
Wilbert Hamilton, Dalhousie Ward
Howard Henry, Carleton Ward (1950)
Victor Irish, Riverdale Ward
Ernie Jones, Westboro Ward (1950)
Fred Journeaux, Central Ward
James McAuley, Dalhousie Ward
David McMillan, Riverdale Ward
Jules Morin, By Ward
Archibald Newman, Gloucester Ward (1950)
William Newton, St. George's Ward
Noel Ogilvie, Capital Ward
Charles Parker, Wellington Ward
Harry Parslow, Westboro Ward (1950)
John Powers, Rideau Ward
Eric Query, By Ward
Alex Roger, Gloucester Ward (1950)
J. Grant Shaw, Central Ward
Charles St. Germain, St. George's Ward
Roly Wall, Elmdale Ward
Martin M. Walsh, Wellington Ward

1947–1948
J. E. Stanley Lewis, mayor
Grenville Goodwin, controller
E. A. Bourque, controller
G. M. Geldert, controller
Finley McRae, controller
Clem Aubin, Ottawa Ward
Leslie G. Avery, Rideau Ward
Edward Band, Capital Ward
Aristide Belanger, Ottawa Ward
Henry Bradley, Elmdale Ward
Leonard L. Coulter, Riverdale Ward
Roy Donaldson, St. George's Ward
Frank Ellis, Victoria Ward
Wilbert Hamilton, Dalhousie Ward
Fred Journeaux, Central Ward
Daniel McCann, Dalhousie Ward
Joseph McCulloch, Capital Ward
David McMillan, Riverdale Ward
William Newton, St. George's Ward
J. Albert Parisien, By Ward
Charles Parker, Wellington Ward
John Powers, Rideau Ward
George W. Pingle, Elmdale Ward
Eric Query, By Ward
J. Grant Shaw, Central Ward
Paul Tardif, Victoria Ward
Martin M. Walsh, Wellington Ward

1945–1946
J. E. Stanley Lewis, mayor
Grenville Goodwin, controller
G. M. Geldert, controller
Finley McRae, controller
E. A. Bourque, controller
Leslie G. Avery, Rideau Ward
Edward Band, Capital Ward
Aristide Belanger, Ottawa Ward
Napoleon A. Bourdeleau, Ottawa Ward
Henry Bradley, Elmdale Ward
Leonard L. Coulter, Riverdale Ward
Roy Donaldson, St. George's Ward
Frank Ellis, Victoria Ward
Wilbert Hamilton, Dalhousie Ward
Fred Journeaux, Central Ward
Daniel McCann, Dalhousie Ward
Joseph McCulloch, Capital Ward
David McMillan, Riverdale Ward
Jules Morin, By Ward
Charles Parker, Wellington Ward
Arthur A. Pinard, St. George's Ward
John Powers, Rideau Ward
George W. Pingle, Elmdale Ward
Eric Query, By Ward
J. Grant Shaw, Central Ward
Paul Tardif, Victoria Ward
Martin M. Walsh, Wellington Ward

1943–1944
J. E. Stanley Lewis, mayor
G. M. Geldert, controller
Finley McRae, controller
E. A. Bourque, controller
Grenville Goodwin, controller
Leslie G. Avery, Rideau Ward
Edward Band, Capital Ward
Aristide Belanger, Ottawa Ward
Napoleon A. Bourdeleau, Ottawa Ward
Henry Bradley, Elmdale Ward
S. H. Chandler, Wellington Ward
Leonard L. Coulter, Riverdale Ward
Wilbert Hamilton, Dalhousie Ward
Daniel McCann, Dalhousie Ward
Joseph McCulloch, Capital Ward
David McMillan, Riverdale Ward
J. P. Nolan, Victoria Ward
J. Albert Parisien, By Ward
Charles Parker, Wellington Ward
George F. Perley, Central Ward
Arthur A. Pinard, St. George's Ward
John Powers, Rideau Ward
George W. Pingle, Elmdale Ward
Eric Query, By Ward
J. Grant Shaw, Central Ward
Paul Tardif, Victoria Ward
Harold Taylor, St. George's Ward

1941–1942
J. E. Stanley Lewis, mayor
C. E. Pickering, controller
G. M. Geldert, controller
E. A. Bourque, controller
Jim Forward, controller
Arthur J. Ash, Wellington Ward
Edward Band, Capital Ward
Aristide Belanger, Ottawa Ward
Napoleon A. Bourdeleau, Ottawa Ward
Henry Bradley, Elmdale Ward
Leonard L. Coulter, Riverdale Ward
Wilbert Hamilton, Dalhousie Ward
Fred Journeaux, Central Ward
Nelson J. Lacasse, Victoria Ward
Daniel McCann, Dalhousie Ward
Joseph McCulloch, Capital Ward
David McMillan, Riverdale Ward
J. P. Nolan, Victoria Ward
J. Albert Parisien, By Ward
George F. Perley, Central Ward
Arthur A. Pinard, St. George's Ward
John Powers, Rideau Ward
George W. Pingle, Elmdale Ward
Eric Query, By Ward
A. W. Spearman, Rideau Ward
Harold Taylor, St. George's Ward
Martin M. Walsh, Wellington Ward

1940
J. E. Stanley Lewis, mayor
E. A. Bourque, controller
G. M. Geldert, controller
Jim Forward, controller
J. H. Putnam, controller
Arthur J. Ash, Wellington Ward
Edward Band, Capital Ward
Aristide Belanger, Ottawa Ward
Napoleon A. Bourdeleau, Ottawa Ward
Henry Bradley, Elmdale Ward
Leonard L. Coulter, Riverdale Ward
Wilbert Hamilton, Dalhousie Ward
Hamnett P. Hill, Jr., St. George's Ward
Fred Journeaux, Central Ward
Nelson J. Lacasse, Victoria Ward
Daniel McCann, Dalhousie Ward
David McMillan, Riverdale Ward
J. P. Nolan, Victoria Ward
J. Albert Parisien, By Ward
George F. Perley, Central Ward
C. E. Pickering, Capital Ward
Arthur A. Pinard, St. George's Ward
John Powers, Rideau Ward
Eric Query, By Ward
A. W. Spearman, Rideau Ward
David Sprague, Elmdale Ward
Martin M. Walsh, Wellington Ward

1939
J. E. Stanley Lewis, mayor
Finley McRae, controller
G. M. Geldert, controller
E. A. Bourque, controller
J. H. Putnam, controller
Arthur J. Ash, Wellington Ward
Edward Band, Capital Ward
Aristide Belanger, Ottawa Ward
Napoleon A. Bourdeleau, Ottawa Ward
Henry Bradley, Elmdale Ward
Fred J. Goodhouse, Rideau Ward
Wilbert Hamilton, Dalhousie Ward
Fred Journeaux, Central Ward
Nelson J. Lacasse, Victoria Ward
Daniel McCann, Dalhousie Ward
David McMillan, Riverdale Ward
J. P. Nolan, Victoria Ward
J. Albert Parisien, By Ward
George F. Perley, Central Ward
C. E. Pickering, Capital Ward
Arthur A. Pinard, St. George's Ward
George W. Pingle, Elmdale Ward
John Powers, Rideau Ward
Eric Query, By Ward
George Sloan, Riverdale Ward
Harold Taylor, St. George's Ward
Martin M. Walsh, Wellington Ward

1938
J. E. Stanley Lewis, mayor
G. M. Geldert, controller
E. A. Bourque, controller
J. Edward McVeigh, controller
Finley McRae, controller
Joseph Allard, Victoria Ward
Arthur J. Ash, Wellington Ward
Edward Band, Capital Ward
Aristide Belanger, Ottawa Ward
Napoleon A. Bourdeleau, Ottawa Ward
James A. Forward, Elmdale Ward
Fred J. Goodhouse, Rideau Ward
Wilbert Hamilton, Dalhousie Ward
Fred Journeaux, Central Ward
Harold D. Marshall, Capital Ward
Daniel McCann, Dalhousie Ward
David McMillan, Riverdale Ward
J. P. Nolan, Victoria Ward
J. Albert Parisien, By Ward
George F. Perley, Central Ward
Arthur A. Pinard, St. George's Ward
George W. Pingle, Elmdale Ward
John Powers, Rideau Ward
Eric Query, By Ward
George Sloan, Riverdale Ward
Harold Taylor, St. George's Ward
Martin M. Walsh, Wellington Ward

1937
J. E. Stanley Lewis, mayor
G. M. Geldert, controller
George H. Dunbar, controller
Allan B. Turner, controller
E. A. Bourque, controller
Arthur J. Ash, Wellington Ward
Edward Band, Capital Ward
A. E. Beauchamp, Ottawa Ward
Aristide Belanger, Ottawa Ward
James A. Forward, Elmdale Ward
Fred J. Goodhouse, Rideau Ward
Wilbert Hamilton, Dalhousie Ward
Fred Journeaux, Central Ward
Nelson J. Lacasse, Victoria Ward
Norman H. MacDonald, St. George's Ward
William H. Marsden, Elmdale Ward
Harold D. Marshall, Capital Ward
Daniel McCann, Dalhousie Ward
David McMillan, Riverdale Ward
James W. McNabb, Wellington Ward
Finley McRae, Central Ward
J. P. Nolan, Victoria Ward
J. Albert Parisien, By Ward
Arthur A. Pinard, St. George's Ward
John Powers, Rideau Ward
Eric Query, By Ward
George Sloan, Riverdale Ward

1936
J. E. Stanley Lewis, mayor
G. M. Geldert, controller
George H. Dunbar, controller
Allan B. Turner, controller
J. Edward McVeigh, controller
Arthur J. Ash, Wellington Ward
Edward Band, Capital Ward
Aristide Belanger, Ottawa Ward
Napoleon A. Bordeleau, Ottawa Ward
James A. Forward, Elmdale Ward
Wilbert Hamilton, Dalhousie Ward
Fred Journeaux, Central Ward
Nelson J. Lacasse, Victoria Ward
Norman H. MacDonald, St. George's Ward
William H. Marsden, Elmdale Ward
Harold D. Marshall, Capital Ward
Daniel McCann, Dalhousie Ward
David McMillan, Riverdale Ward
James W. McNabb, Wellington Ward
Finley McRae, Central Ward
J. P. Nolan, Victoria Ward
Joseph Albert Parisien, By Ward
Arthur A. Pinard, St. George's Ward
Eric Query, By Ward
Shirley S. Slinn, Rideau Ward
George Sloan, Riverdale Ward
A. W. Spearman, Rideau Ward

1935
Patrick Nolan, mayor
J. E. Stanley Lewis, controller
G. M. Geldert, controller
J. Edward McVeigh, controller
Fulgence Charpentier, controller
Edward Band, Capital Ward
Aristide Belanger, Ottawa Ward
Napoleon A. Bordeleau, Ottawa Ward
A. W. (Fred) Desjardins, By Ward
Jim Forward, Elmdale Ward
Wilbert Hamilton, Dalhousie Ward
Nelson J. Lacasse, Victoria Ward
Norman H. MacDonald, St. George's Ward
William H. Marsden, Elmdale Ward
Harold D. Marshall, Capital Ward
Daniel McCann, Dalhousie Ward
David McMillan, Riverdale Ward
James W. McNabb, Wellington Ward
Finley McRae, Central Ward
J. P. Nolan, Victoria Ward
Joseph Albert Parisien, By Ward
Arthur A. Pinard, St. George's Ward
Shirley S. Slinn, Rideau Ward
George Sloan, Riverdale Ward
A. W. Spearman, Rideau Ward
Allan B. Turner, Central Ward
Martin M. Walsh, Wellington Ward

1934
Patrick Nolan, mayor
Tom Brethour, controller
J. E. Stanley Lewis, controller
G. M. Geldert, controller
Fulgence Charpentier, controller
Edward Band, Capital Ward
Kirby Bangs, Central Ward
Aristide Belanger, Ottawa Ward
Napoleon A. Bordeleau, Ottawa Ward
Fred Desjardins, By Ward
Jim Forward, Elmdale Ward
Nelson J. Lacasse, Victoria Ward
Norman H. MacDonald, St. George's Ward
William H. Marsden, Elmdale Ward
Harold D. Marshall, Capital Ward
Daniel McCann, Dalhousie Ward
David McMillan, Riverdale Ward
James W. McNabb, Wellington Ward
James J. McVeigh, Dalhousie Ward
Joseph Albert Parisien, By Ward
Arthur A. Pinard, St. George's Ward
Rod Plant, Rideau Ward
Harold C. Shipman, Central Ward
George Sloan, Riverdale Ward
A. W. Spearman, Rideau Ward
Martin M. Walsh, Wellington Ward
John R. Welch, Victoria Ward

1933
John J. Allen, mayor
Fulgence Charpentier, controller
G. M. Geldert, controller
George H. Dunbar, controller
J. E. Stanley Lewis, controller
Edward Band, Capital Ward
Kirby Bangs, Central Ward
Aristide Belanger, Ottawa Ward
Napoleon A. Bordeleau, Ottawa Ward
Fred Desjardins, By Ward
Jim Forward, Elmdale Ward
Wilbert Hamilton, Dalhousie Ward
Nelson J. Lacasse, Victoria Ward
Norman H. MacDonald, St. George's Ward
William H. Marsden, Elmdale Ward
Harold D. Marshall, Capital Ward
E. P. McGrath, Dalhousie Ward
James W. McNabb, Wellington Ward
J. Edward McVeigh, Wellington Ward
Raoul Mercier, By Ward
Arthur A. Pinard, St. George's Ward
Rod Plant, Rideau Ward
George Pushman, Riverdale Ward
Charles E. Reid, Rideau Ward
Harold C. Shipman, Central Ward
George Sloan, Riverdale Ward
John R. Welch, Victoria Ward

1932
John J. Allen, mayor
Fulgence Charpentier, controller
Daniel McCann, controller
George H. Dunbar, controller
G. M. Geldert, controller
Edward Band, Capital Ward
Kirby Bangs, Central Ward
Aristide Belanger, Ottawa Ward
Tom Brethour, Rideau Ward
Fred Desjardins, By Ward
Jim Forward, Elmdale Ward
Wilbert Hamilton, Dalhousie Ward
Nelson J. Lacasse, Victoria Ward
William R. Low, Central Ward
Norman H. MacDonald, St. George's Ward
William H. Marsden, Elmdale Ward
Harold D. Marshall, Capital Ward
E. P. McGrath, Dalhousie Ward
James W. McNabb, Wellington Ward
J. Edward McVeigh, Wellington Ward
George J. O'Connor, St. George's Ward
Joseph Albert Parisien, By Ward
Rod Plant, Rideau Ward
George Pushman, Riverdale Ward
George Sloan, Riverdale Ward
W. J. St. Aubin, Ottawa Ward
John R. Welch, Victoria Ward

1931
John J. Allen, mayor
G. M. Geldert, controller
James Warren York, controller
J. E. Stanley Lewis, controller
George H. Dunbar, controller
Edward Band, Capital Ward
Kirby Bangs, Central Ward
Aristide Belanger, Ottawa Ward
Tom Brethour, Rideau Ward
Fulgence Charpentier, St. George's Ward
Sam Crooks, Elmdale Ward
Fred Desjardins, By Ward
Jim Forward, Elmdale Ward
Ernest Laroche, Victoria Ward
William R. Low, Central Ward
Norman H. MacDonald, St. George's Ward
Harold D. Marshall, Capital Ward
Dan McCann, Dalhousie Ward
E. P. McGrath, Dalhousie Ward
James W. McNabb, Wellington Ward
J. Edward McVeigh, Wellington Ward
Rod Plant, Rideau Ward
George Pushman, Riverdale Ward
Eric Query, By Ward
George Sloan, Riverdale Ward
Wilfrid St. Aubin, Ottawa Ward
John R. Welch, Victoria Ward

1930
Frank H. Plant, mayor 
Charles J. Tulley, controller
Frank LaFortune, controller
Gerald Sims, controller 
John J. Allen, controller
Edward Band, Capital Ward
Aristide Belanger, Ottawa Ward
Tom Brethour, Rideau Ward
Sam Crooks, Elmdale Ward
T. E. Dansereau, St. George Ward
C. M. Denneny, Dalhousie Ward 
Fred Desjardins, By Ward
Jim Forward, Elmdale Ward
Nelson J. Lacasse, Victoria Ward 
Ernest Laroche, Victoria Ward
J. E. Stanley Lewis, Central Ward
William R. Low, Central Ward
Norman H. MacDonald, St. George Ward
Dan McCann, Dalhousie Ward
James W. McNabb, Wellington Ward
J. Edward McVeigh, Wellington Ward
Rod Plant, Rideau Ward
George Pushman, Riverdale Ward
Eric Query, By Ward
George Sloan, Riverdale Ward
Wilfrid St. Aubin, Ottawa Ward
James Warren York, Capital Ward

1929
Arthur Ellis, mayor 
Frank H. Plant, controller
Charles J. Tulley, controller
Frank LaFortune, controller
Gerald Sims, controller
Aristide Belanger, Ottawa Ward
Tom Brethour, Rideau Ward
Sam Crooks, Dalhousie Ward
T. E. Dansereau, St. George Ward
Fred Desjardins, By Ward
Jim Forward, Dalhousie Ward
G. M. Geldert, Central Ward
Nelson J. Lacasse, Victoria Ward 
Ernest Laroche, Victoria Ward
William R. Low, Central Ward
Norman H. MacDonald, St. George Ward
James W. McNabb, Wellington Ward
J. Edward McVeigh, Wellington Ward
J. A. Pinard, Ottawa Ward
Rod Plant, Rideau Ward
George Pushman, Capital Ward
Eric Query, By Ward
James Warren York, Capital Ward

1928
Arthur Ellis, mayor 
Frank H. Plant, controller
Charles J. Tulley, controller
Frank LaFortune, controller
Herbert McElroy, controller
Aristide Belanger, Ottawa Ward
Tom Brethour, Rideau Ward
Sam Crooks, Dalhousie Ward
Walter Cunningham, St. George
T. E. Dansereau, St. George Ward
Fred Desjardins, By Ward
George H. Dunbar, Rideau Ward
McGregor Easson, Capital Ward
Jim Forward, Dalhousie Ward
G. M. Geldert, Central Ward
Nelson J. Lacasse, Victoria Ward 
Joseph Landriault, Ottawa Ward
Ernest Laroche, Victoria Ward
William R. Low, Central Ward
James W. McNabb, Wellington Ward
J. Edward McVeigh, Wellington Ward
Joseph Albert Parisien, By Ward
James Warren York, Capital Ward

1927
John P. Balharrie, mayor 
Arthur Ellis, controller
Charles J. Tulley, controller
Frank LaFortune, controller
Herbert McElroy, controller
Aristide Belanger, Ottawa Ward
Sam Crooks, Dalhousie Ward
Thomas E. Dansereau, St. George Ward
Fred Desjardins, By Ward
McGregor Easson, Capital Ward
David Esdale, Rideau Ward
Jim Forward, Dalhousie Ward
G. M. Geldert, Central Ward
Robert Ingram, Rideau Ward
Joseph Landriault, Ottawa Ward
Ernest Laroche, Victoria Ward
William R. Low, Central Ward
Ernest D. Lowe, Wellington Ward
James W. McNabb, Wellington Ward
George J. O'Connor, St. George Ward
Eric Query, By Ward
Gerald Sims, Victoria Ward
James Warren York, Capital Ward

1926
John P. Balharrie, mayor 
Arthur Ellis, controller
Charles J. Tulley, controller
Herbert McElroy, controller 
Frank H. Plant, controller
Aristide Belanger, Ottawa Ward
Thomas Brethour, Rideau Ward
Sam Crooks, Dalhousie Ward
Thomas E. Dansereau, St. George Ward
McGregor Easson, Capital Ward
David Esdale, Rideau Ward
Jim Forward, Dalhousie Ward
Frank LaFortune, By Ward
Ernest Laroche, Victoria Ward
William R. Low, Central Ward
Ernest D. Lowe, Wellington Ward
Harold D. McCormick, Capital Ward
James W. McNabb, Wellington Ward
Hugh J. McNulty, St. George Ward
J. A. Pinard, Ottawa Ward
Eric Query, By Ward
Gerald Sims, Victoria Ward
C. Allen Snowdon, Central Ward

1925
John P. Balharrie, mayor 
Napoléon Champagne, controller
Charles J. Tulley, controller
Herbert McElroy, controller 
Frank H. Plant, controller
Napoleon Bordeleau, Ottawa Ward
Thomas Brethour, Rideau Ward
Sam Crooks, Dalhousie Ward
Walter Cunningham, St. George
McGregor Easson, Capital Ward
Dave Esdale, Rideau Ward
Jim Forward, Dalhousie Ward
Frank Lafortune, By Ward
Omer Langlois, St. George
Ernest Laroche, Victoria Ward
William R. Low, Central Ward
Ernest D. Lowe, Wellington Ward
Harold D. McCormick, Capital Ward
James W. McNabb, Wellington Ward
Eric Query, By Ward
Gerald Sims, Victoria Ward
C. Allen Snowdon, Central Ward
Telmond St. Denis, Ottawa Ward

1924
Henry Watters, mayor (until May 10, 1924)
Napoléon Champagne, controller (mayor from May 1924)
Arthur Ellis, controller
John P. Balharrie, controller
Charles J. Tulley, controller
Napoleon Bordeleau, Ottawa Ward
Sam Crooks, Dalhousie Ward
Walter Cunningham, St. George
Fred Desjardins, By Ward
McGregor Easson, Capital Ward
Dave Esdale, Rideau Ward
Fred Hunt, Dalhousie Ward
Omer Langlois, St. George
Ernest Laroche, Victoria Ward
William R. Low, Central Ward
Ernest D. Lowe, Wellington Ward
Thomas H. Marcil, Rideau Ward
Harold D. McCormick, Capital Ward
James W. McNabb, Wellington Ward
Patrick Nolan, Victoria Ward
Joseph Albert Pinard, Ottawa Ward
Eric Query, By Ward
C. Allen Snowdon, Central Ward

1923
Frank H. Plant, mayor
John Cameron, controller
Arthur Ellis, controller
John P. Balharrie, controller
Joseph McGuire, controller
Napoleon Bordeleau, Ottawa Ward
T. H. Brewer, Capital Ward
Rupert Broadfoot, Rideau Ward
Walter Cunningham, St. George
Fred Desjardins, By Ward
J. A. Forward, Dalhousie Ward
Edward Gaulin, By Ward
Fred Hunt, Dalhousie Ward
Ernest Laroche, Victoria Ward
William R. Low, Central Ward
Ernest D. Lowe, Wellington Ward
Douglas H. Macdonald, Rideau Ward
W. J. McCaffrey, St. George Ward
H. H. McElroy, Capital Ward
James W. McNabb, Wellington Ward
Patrick Nolan, Victoria Ward
C. Allen Snowdon, Central Ward
Telmond St. Denis, Ottawa Ward

1922
Frank H. Plant, mayor
John Cameron, controller
Arthur Ellis, controller
John P. Balharrie, controller
Napoléon Champagne, controller
Napoleon Bordeleau, Ottawa Ward
T. H. Brewer, Capital Ward
Rupert Broadfoot, Rideau Ward
Walter Cunningham, St. George
Fred Desjardins, By Ward
J. A. Forward, Dalhousie Ward
Edward Gaulin, By Ward
Waldo Guertin, Ottawa Ward
Ernest Laroche, Victoria Ward
Ernest D. Lowe, Wellington Ward
Douglas H. Macdonald, Rideau Ward
W. J. McCaffrey, St. George Ward
Herbert H. McElroy, Capital Ward
James W. McNabb, Wellington Ward
Patrick Nolan, Victoria Ward
W. E. O'Meara, Dalhousie Ward
C. G. Pepper, Central Ward
C. Allen Snowdon, Central Ward

1921
Frank H. Plant, mayor
John Cameron, controller
Arthur Ellis, controller
John P. Balharrie, controller
Napoléon Champagne, controller
Napoleon Bordeleau, Ottawa Ward
Rupert Broadfoot, Rideau Ward
Walter Cunningham, St. George
Fred Desjardins, By Ward
James A. Forward, Dalhousie Ward
Edward Gaulin, By Ward
Fred Hunt, Dalhousie Ward
Ernest Laroche, Victoria Ward
Ernest D. Lowe, Wellington Ward
Douglas H. Macdonald, Rideau Ward
Herbert H. McElroy, Capital Ward
James W. McNabb, Wellington Ward
Charles Pepper, Central Ward
Joseph Albert Pinard, Ottawa Ward
Sam Rosenthal, Victoria Ward
J. J. Slattery, Capital Ward
C. Allen Snowdon, Central Ward
Leslie Whyte, St. George Ward

1920
Harold Fisher, mayor
Frank H. Plant, controller
John Cameron, controller
Joseph Kent, controller
Napoléon Champagne, controller
John P. Balharrie, Dalhousie Ward
Napoleon Bordeleau, Ottawa Ward
Walter Cunningham, St. George Ward
William Y. Denison, Capital Ward
James D. Denny, Wellington Ward (until Mar. 1)
Fred Desjardins, By Ward
Arthur Ellis, Rideau Ward
Arthur R. Ford, Capital Ward (until Sept. 20)
James A. Forward, Dalhousie Ward
Edward Gaulin, By Ward
Wilfrid J. Grace, St. George Ward 
Ernest Laroche, Victoria Ward
Ernest D. Lowe, Wellington Ward
Douglas H. Macdonald, Rideau Ward
Joseph G. McGuire, Wellington Ward (from Mar. 22)
John F. McKinley, Central Ward
Charles Pepper, Central Ward
Joseph Albert Pinard, Ottawa Ward
David Rice, Victoria Ward

1919
Harold Fisher, mayor
Frank H. Plant, controller
J. W. Nelson, controller (until Dec. 1)
Joseph Kent, controller
Napoléon Champagne, controller
John P. Balharrie, Dalhousie Ward
Walter Cunningham, St. George Ward (controller from Dec. 1 on)
William Y. Denison, Capital Ward
James D. Denny, Wellington Ward
Fred Desjardins, By Ward
Arthur R. Ford, Capital Ward
James A. Forward, Dalhousie Ward
Edward Gaulin, By Ward
Wilfrid J. Grace, St. George Ward
Waldo Guertin, Ottawa Ward 
Ernest Laroche, Victoria Ward
Douglas H. Macdonald, Rideau Ward
John F. McKinley, Central Ward
Charles Pepper, Central Ward
Joseph Albert Pinard, Ottawa Ward
David Rice, Victoria Ward
Breary Slinn, Rideau Ward 
Charles R. Stephen, Wellington Ward

1918
Harold Fisher, mayor
James Muir, controller
Ainslie W. Greene, controller 
Joseph Kent, controller
Napoléon Champagne, controller
John P. Balharrie, Dalhousie Ward
William Cherry, Rideau Ward
Walter Cunningham, St. George Ward (controller from Dec. 1 on)
James D. Denny, Wellington Ward
Fred Desjardins, By Ward
William Findlay, Central Ward
Arthur R. Ford, Capital Ward
James A. Forward, Dalhousie Ward
Edward Gaulin, By Ward
Wilfrid J. Grace, St. George Ward
Ernest Laroche, Victoria Ward
Douglas H. Macdonald, Rideau Ward
Charles Pepper, Central Ward
Joseph Albert Pinard, Ottawa Ward
Frank H. Plant, Capital Ward
Oscar Racine, Ottawa Ward
David Rice, Victoria Ward
Charles R. Stephen, Wellington Ward

1917
Harold Fisher, mayor
Edward H. Hinchey, controller
John W. Nelson, controller 
Joseph Kent, controller
Napoléon Champagne, controller
Thomas R. Browne, Capital Ward
William Cherry, Rideau Ward
Walter Cunningham, St. George Ward  
James D. Denny, Wellington Ward
Fred Desjardins, By Ward
James A. Forward, Dalhousie Ward
B. S. Hastey, St. George Ward
Eugene J. Labelle, By Ward
Ernest Laroche, Victoria Ward
John A. Macdonald, Central Ward
Edward P. McGrath, Dalhousie Ward
Charles Pepper, Central Ward
Joseph Albert Pinard, Ottawa Ward
Frank H. Plant, Capital Ward
Oscar Racine, Ottawa Ward
David Rice, Victoria Ward
Breary Slinn, Rideau Ward
Charles R. Stephen, Wellington Ward

1916
Nelson D. Porter, mayor
Harold Fisher, controller
John W. Nelson, controller 
Joseph Kent, controller
Napoléon Champagne, controller
Thomas Brethour, Rideau Ward
Thomas R. Browne, Capital Ward
William Cherry, Rideau Ward
Walter Cunningham, St. George Ward  
James D. Denny, Wellington Ward
J. W. Featherston, Wellington Ward
William Findlay, Central Ward
James A. Forward, Dalhousie Ward
Edouard Gaulin, By Ward
B. S. Hastey, St. George Ward
Eugene J. Labelle, By Ward
Ernest Laroche, Victoria Ward
W. C. Leech, Dalhousie Ward
James Muir, Capital Ward
Charles Pepper, Central Ward
Joseph Albert Pinard, Ottawa Ward
Oscar Racine, Ottawa Ward
D. A. Sinclair, Victoria Ward

1915
Nelson D. Porter, mayor
Harold Fisher, controller
John W. Nelson, controller 
J. A. Ellis, controller
Napoléon Champagne, controller
Henry Ackland, Rideau Ward
T. T. Beattie, Dalhousie Ward
Thomas Brethour, Rideau Ward
John Carnochan, Capital Ward
Walter Cunningham, St. George Ward  
James D. Denny, Wellington Ward
J. W. Featherston, Wellington Ward
William Findlay, Central Ward
Edouard Gaulin, By Ward
Alphonse Julien, By Ward
Ernest Laroche, Victoria Ward
Edward P. McGrath, Dalhousie Ward
James Muir, Capital Ward
George J. O'Connor, St. George Ward
Charles Pepper, Central Ward
Joseph Albert Pinard, Ottawa Ward
Oscar Racine, Ottawa Ward
David Rice, Victoria Ward

1914
Taylor McVeity, mayor
E. R. McNeill, controller
John W. Nelson, controller 
Joseph Kent, controller
Rufus H. Parent, controller
T. T. Beattie, Dalhousie Ward
Arthur Beaulieu, Ottawa Ward
Thomas Brethour, Rideau Ward
John Carnochan, Capital Ward
Walter Cunningham, St. George Ward  
Alfred W. Desjardins, By Ward
William Findlay, Central Ward
Harold Fisher, Wellington Ward
W. N. Graham, Capital Ward
Frederick D. Hogg, Central Ward
Eugene Labelle, By Ward
Ernest Laroche, Victoria Ward
Harry Low, Rideau Ward
William Macdonald, Wellington Ward
George J. O'Connor, St. George Ward
Joseph Albert Pinard, Ottawa Ward
William C. Rowe, Dalhousie Ward
David Rice, Victoria Ward

1913
James A. Ellis, mayor
Edward H. Hinchey, controller
Joseph Kent, controller
John W. Nelson, controller 
Rufus H. Parent, controller
Arthur W. Ault, Capital Ward
Arthur Beaulieu, Ottawa Ward
Thomas Brethour, Rideau Ward
John Carnochan, Capital Ward
William Cherry, Rideau Ward
Walter Cunningham, St. George Ward  
Alfred W. Desjardins, By Ward
Harold Fisher, Wellington Ward
James A. Forward, Dalhousie Ward
Ainslie W. Greene, Victoria Ward
Frederick D. Hogg, Central Ward
Eugene Labelle, By Ward
Ernest Laroche, Victoria Ward
William Macdonald, Wellington Ward
Edward R. McNeill, Central Ward
George J. O'Connor, St. George Ward
Oscar Racine, Ottawa Ward
William C. Rowe, Dalhousie Ward

1912
Charles Hopewell, mayor (until June 21)
Edward H. Hinchey, controller (mayor after June 21)
Stewart McClenaghan, controller
Robert Hastey, controller
Rufus H. Parent, controller
Arthur W. Ault, Capital Ward
William G. Black, Wellington Ward
William Campbell, Wellington Ward
Rodolphe Chevrier, St. George Ward  
Alfred W. Desjardins, By Ward
E. R. Desrosiers, Ottawa Ward
James A. Forward, Dalhousie Ward
William Foster Garland, Victoria Ward
Ainslie W. Greene, Victoria Ward
Frederick D. Hogg, Central Ward
Joseph Kent, Central Ward
Moïse Lapointe, By Ward
J. W. Nelson, Capital Ward
George J. O'Connor, St. George Ward
Frank E. Perney, Rideau Ward
John H. Slack, Dalhousie Ward
Breary Slinn, Rideau Ward
R. E. Valin, Ottawa Ward

1911
Charles Hopewell, mayor  
Napoleon Champagne, controller
James Davidson, controller (until Oct. 7)
Robert Hastey, controller
Edward H. Hinchey, controller
W. E. Brown, Victoria Ward (controller after Nov. 6)
Herbert S. Campbell, Central Ward
William Campbell, Wellington Ward
John Carnochan, Capital Ward
Walter Cunningham, St. George Ward
James A. Forward, Dalhousie Ward
John C. Grant, Rideau Ward
Edward Gaulin, By Ward
Alphonse Julien, Ottawa Ward
Joseph Kent, Central Ward
Moïse Lapointe, By Ward
Donald T. Masson, Wellington Ward
J. W. Nelson, Capital Ward
Joseph Albert Pinard, Ottawa Ward
John H. Slack, Dalhousie Ward (resigned Jan. 9; re-elected Jan. 26)
Breary Slinn, Rideau Ward
L. E. Stanley, Victoria Ward
William R. Stroud, St. George Ward

1910
Charles Hopewell, mayor  
Napoleon Champagne, controller
James Davidson, controller (until Nov. 25)
Robert Hastey, controller
Edward H. Hinchey, controller
John Baxter, By Ward
W. W. Boucher, Wellington Ward (until Oct. 3)
William G. Black, Wellington Ward
Victor Boisvert, Dalhousie Ward
Ira Bower, Central Ward
W. E. Brown, Victoria Ward (controller after Nov. 6)
Herbert S. Campbell, Central Ward
William Campbell, Wellington Ward (from Oct. 20)
A. E. Caron, St. George Ward
John Carnochan, Capital Ward
Walter Cunningham, St. George Ward
A. W. Desjardins, By Ward
James A. Forward, Dalhousie Ward
John C. Grant, Rideau Ward
Alphonse Julien, Ottawa Ward
Thomas E. McDonald, Rideau Ward
J. W. Nelson, Capital Ward
Joseph Albert Pinard, Ottawa Ward
L. E. Stanley, Victoria Ward

1909
Charles Hopewell, mayor  
Napoleon Champagne, controller
James Davidson, controller (until Nov. 25)
Robert Hastey, controller
George H. Wilson, controller
John Baxter, By Ward
Ira Bower, Central Ward
W. E. Brown, Victoria Ward 
A. E. Caron, St. George Ward
Walter Cunningham, St. George Ward (until Apr. 19)
A. W. Desjardins, By Ward
R. King Farrow, Wellington Ward
John C. Grant, Rideau Ward
Edward H. Hinchey, Wellington Ward
Alphonse Julien, Ottawa Ward
George A. Little, Central Ward
Edward P. McGrath, Dalhousie Ward
Joseph Albert Pinard, Ottawa Ward
Samuel Rosenthal, Victoria Ward
George R. Ross, Dalhousie Ward
Breary Slinn, Rideau Ward
William R. Stroud, Wellington Ward (after May 11)

1908
D'Arcy Scott, mayor (until Nov. 12)  
Napoleon Champagne, controller (mayor after Nov. 12)
James Davidson, controller (until Nov. 25)
Robert Hastey, controller
Charles Hopewell, controller
C. S. O. Boudreault, Ottawa Ward
W. E. Brown, Victoria Ward 
Walter Cunningham, St. George Ward 
S. J. Davis, Central Ward 
A. W. Desjardins, By Ward
William Farmer, Dalhousie Ward
R. King Farrow, Wellington Ward
William Foran, St. George Ward
Edmond Gauthier, Ottawa Ward
John C. Grant, Rideau Ward
Charles Lapierre, By Ward
George A. Little, Central Ward
Edward P. McGrath, Dalhousie Ward (controller after Nov. 18)
Samuel Rosenthal, Victoria Ward
Breary Slinn, Rideau Ward
George H. Wilson, Wellington Ward

1907
D'Arcy Scott, mayor
John Armstrong, Victoria Ward
John Askwith, Rideau Ward
W. W. Boucher, Victoria Ward
C. S. O. Boudreault, Ottawa Ward
Napoleon Champagne, Ottawa Ward
Walter Cunningham, St. George Ward 
James Davidson, Wellington Ward
S. J. Davis, Central Ward 
A. W. Desjardins, By Ward
William Farmer, Dalhousie Ward
R. King Farrow, Wellington Ward
Edmond Gauthier, Ottawa Ward
John C. Grant, Rideau Ward
Robert Hastey, St. George Ward
Alphonse Julien, By Ward
John G. Kilt, St. George Ward
Charles Lapierre, By Ward
George A. Little, Central Ward
Edward P. McGrath, Dalhousie Ward  
Charles G. Pepper, Central Ward
Samuel Rosenthal, Victoria Ward
George R. Ross, Dalhousie Ward
William Short, Rideau Ward
George H. Wilson, Wellington Ward

1906
James A. Ellis, mayor (until Dec. 17)
John Armstrong, Victoria Ward
C. S. O. Boudreault, Ottawa Ward
W. E. Brown, Victoria Ward
Napoleon Champagne, Ottawa Ward
Walter Cunningham, St. George Ward 
James Davidson, Wellington Ward
S. J. Davis, Central Ward 
A. W. Desjardins, By Ward
Edmond Gauthier, Ottawa Ward
John Gleeson, By Ward
Robert Hastey, St. George Ward (mayor after Dec. 17)
Charles Hopewell, Dalhousie Ward
Charles Lapierre, By Ward
E. J. Laverdure, St. George Ward
Edward P. McGrath, Dalhousie Ward  
Charles G. Pepper, Central Ward
J. H. Putnam, Rideau Ward 
Samuel Rosenthal, Victoria Ward
George R. Ross, Dalhousie Ward
A. E. Sanderson, Wellington Ward
William Short, Rideau Ward
Breary Slinn, Rideau Ward
Daniel Storey, Central Ward
George H. Wilson, Wellington Ward

1905
James A. Ellis, mayor
John Armstrong, Victoria Ward
John Askwith, Rideau Ward
William G. Black, Wellington Ward
C. S. O. Boudreault, Ottawa Ward
W. E. Brown, Victoria Ward (after July 3)
Napoleon Champagne, Ottawa Ward
James Davidson, Wellington Ward
A. W. Desjardins, By Ward
J. C. Enright, Victoria Ward (until July 3)
William Farmer, Dalhousie Ward
Edmond Gauthier, Ottawa Ward
John Gleeson, By Ward
John C. Grant, Rideau Ward
Robert Hastey, St. George Ward  
Fred Journeaux, Central Ward
Charles Lapierre, By Ward
E. J. Laverdure, St. George Ward 
Michael O'Leary, St. George Ward
Charles G. Pepper, Central Ward
Moïse Plouffe, Dalhousie Ward
Samuel Rosenthal, Victoria Ward
George R. Ross, Dalhousie Ward
A. E. Sanderson, Wellington Ward
Breary Slinn, Rideau Ward
Daniel Storey, Central Ward

1904
James A. Ellis, mayor
John Askwith, Rideau Ward
C. S. O. Boudreault, Ottawa Ward
W. E. Brown, Victoria Ward 
William Campbell, Wellington Ward
Napoleon Champagne, Ottawa Ward
O. E. Culbert, Rideau Ward
Walter Cunningham, St. George Ward
James Davidson, Wellington Ward
A. W. Desjardins, By Ward
G. S. Fleming, Victoria Ward
Joseph Foster, Dalhousie Ward
Edmond Gauthier, Ottawa Ward
John C. Grant, Rideau Ward
Robert Hastey, St. George Ward  
Fred Journeaux, Central Ward
Thomas Payment, By Ward
Charles G. Pepper, Central Ward
Moïse Plouffe, Dalhousie Ward
Samuel Rosenthal, Victoria Ward
A. E. Sanderson, Wellington Ward
G. W. Shouldis, Dalhousie Ward
Bernard Slattery, By Ward
Daniel Storey, Central Ward
William R. Stroud, St. George Ward

1903
Fred Cook, mayor
John Askwith, Rideau Ward
Napoleon Champagne, Ottawa Ward
Thomas Cleary, Dalhousie Ward
Walter Cunningham, St. George Ward
James Davidson, Wellington Ward
A. W. Desjardins, By Ward
James A. Ellis, Rideau Ward
J. C. Enright, Victoria Ward
G. S. Fleming, Victoria Ward
John C. Grant, Rideau Ward
Robert Hastey, St. George Ward  
Charles Hopewell, Dalhousie Ward
Fred Journeaux, Central Ward
W. J. Kidd, Wellington Ward
J. M. Lavoie, Ottawa Ward 
Thomas Payment, By Ward
A. L. Pinard, Ottawa Ward
Moïse Plouffe, Dalhousie Ward
Samuel Rosenthal, Victoria Ward
P. D. Ross, Central Ward
A. E. Sanderson, Wellington Ward
Bernard Slattery, By Ward
Daniel Storey, Central Ward
William R. Stroud, St. George Ward

1902
Fred Cook, mayor
John Askwith, Rideau Ward
W. C. Beaman, Wellington Ward
P. H. Chabot, By Ward
Napoleon Champagne, Ottawa Ward
Thomas Cleary, Dalhousie Ward
John Coates, Central Ward
Walter Cunningham, St. George Ward
James Davidson, Wellington Ward
A. W. Desjardins, By Ward
James A. Ellis, Rideau Ward
J. C. Enright, Victoria Ward
Robert Hastey, St. George Ward  
Emery Lapointe, Ottawa Ward 
Thomas Payment, By Ward
Charles G. Pepper, Central Ward
Moïse Plouffe, Dalhousie Ward
Samuel Rosenthal, Victoria Ward
P. D. Ross, Central Ward
A. E. Sanderson, Wellington Ward
G. W. Shouldis, Dalhousie Ward
Breary Slinn, Rideau Ward
William R. Stroud, St. George Ward
Frank D. Taylor, Victoria Ward
J. U. Vincent, Ottawa Ward

1901
William Dowler Morris, mayor (until Nov. 16)
John Askwith, Rideau Ward
G. M. Bayly, Wellington Ward (from June 25)
Napoleon Champagne, Ottawa Ward
Walter Cunningham, St. George Ward
James Davidson, Wellington Ward (mayor from Nov. 16)
Robert Davidson, Dalhousie Ward
George Dearing, Central Ward
A. W. Desjardins, By Ward
James A. Ellis, Rideau Ward
John C. Enright, Victoria Ward
John C. Grant, Rideau Ward
Robert Hastey, St. George Ward
William Hill, Dalhousie Ward  
Charles Hopwell, Wellington Ward
Emery Lapointe, Ottawa Ward 
W. H. Lewis, Central Ward
Donald T. Masson, Victoria Ward
D. J. McDougal, By Ward
F. F. Morris, Wellington Ward (until June 3)
Moïse Plouffe, Dalhousie Ward
S. R. Poulin, By Ward
Daniel Storey, Central Ward
William R. Stroud, St. George Ward
C. B. Taggart, Victoria Ward
J. U. Vincent, Ottawa Ward

1900
 
Thomas Payment, mayor
Thomas Butler, Victoria Ward
Napoleon Champagne, Ottawa Ward
James Davidson, Wellington Ward 
Robert Davidson, Dalhousie Ward 
Samuel J. Davis, Central Ward
George Dearing, Central Ward
A. W. Desjardins, By Ward
John C. Enright, Victoria Ward
George Forde, Rideau Ward
Joseph Foster, Dalhousie Ward
Joseph Gareau, By Ward
Robert Hastey, St. George Ward
William H. Hewlett, Dalhousie Ward
Charles Hopwell, Wellington Ward
Emery Lapointe, Ottawa Ward 
Donald T. Masson, Victoria  Ward
F. F. Morris, Wellington Ward
William Dowler Morris, Central Ward
Thomas Raphael, St. George Ward
John C. Roger, Rideau Ward
D'Arcy Scott, St. George Ward
Breary Slinn, Rideau Ward
Michael Starrs, By Ward
James White, Ottawa Ward

1899
 
Thomas Payment, mayor
Basil H. Bell, Rideau Ward (died in office) 
William G. Black, Wellington Ward
Thomas Butler, Victoria Ward
William Campbell, Wellington Ward
Napoleon Champagne, Ottawa Ward
James Davidson, Wellington Ward
Robert Davidson, Dalhousie Ward
Samuel J. Davis, Central Ward
A. W. Desjardins, By Ward
George Forde, Rideau Ward (elected March 22) 
Joseph Foster, Dalhousie Ward
A. E. Fripp, Central Ward
Joseph Gareau, By Ward
Edmond Gauthier, Ottawa Ward
Robert Hastey, St. George Ward
William H. Hewlett, Dalhousie Ward
H. H. Lang, Victoria Ward
Donald T. Masson, Victoria  Ward
William Dowler Morris, Central Ward
Thomas Raphael, St. George Ward
John C. Roger, Rideau Ward
D'Arcy Scott, St. George Ward
Breary Slinn, Rideau Ward
Michael Starrs, By Ward
James White, Ottawa Ward

1898
 
Samuel Bingham, mayor
William G. Black, Wellington Ward
Thomas Butler, Victoria Ward
William Campbell, Wellington Ward
William Cluff, Central Ward
James Davidson, Wellington Ward
Robert Davidson, Dalhousie Ward
Samuel J. Davis, Central Ward
J. B. Donaldson, Rideau Ward
Olivier Durocher, Ottawa Ward
J. C. Enright, Victoria Ward
Joseph Foster, Dalhousie Ward
Joseph Gareau, By Ward
John C. Grant, St. George Ward
Robert Hastey, St. George Ward
William H. Hewlett, Dalhousie Ward
Emery Lapointe, Ottawa Ward
Donald T. Masson, Victoria  Ward
William Dowler Morris, Central Ward
Thomas Payment, By Ward
S. R. Poulin, By Ward
John C. Roger, Rideau Ward
Breary Slinn, Rideau Ward
William R. Stroud, St. George Ward
James White, Ottawa Ward

1897
 
Samuel Bingham, mayor
William G. Black, Wellington Ward
Thomas Butler, Victoria Ward
William Campbell, Wellington Ward
Fred Cook, Central Ward
Robert Davidson, Dalhousie Ward
J. B. Donaldson, Rideau Ward
O. Durocher, Ottawa Ward
J. C. Enright, Victoria Ward
Joseph Foster, Dalhousie Ward
James D. Fraser, Rideau Ward
Joseph Gareau, By Ward
Edmond Gauthier, Ottawa Ward
John C. Grant, St. George Ward
Robert Hastey, St. George Ward
Donald T. Masson, Victoria  Ward
Terence McGuire, Dalhousie Ward
Thomas Payment, By Ward
C. B. Powell, Central Ward
John C. Roger, Rideau Ward
Maynard Rogers, St. George Ward (resigned in October)
Robert Stewart, Wellington Ward
P. St. Jean, By Ward
R. Tobin, St. George Ward (elected c. October) 
Edward Wallace, Central Ward
James White, Ottawa Ward

1896
 
William Borthwick, mayor
Basil H. Bell, Rideau Ward
Thomas Butler, Victoria Ward
William Campbell, Wellington Ward
Napoleon Champagne, Ottawa Ward
William Cluff, Central Ward
Fred Cook, Central Ward
George Dalglish, Victoria Ward
Robert Davidson, Dalhousie Ward
Samuel J. Davis, Wellington Ward
J. B. Donaldson, Rideau Ward
George Forde, Rdieau Ward
Joseph Gareau, By Ward
Edmond Gauthier, Ottawa Ward
John C. Grant, St. George Ward
Robert Hastey, St. George Ward
William H. Hewlett, Dalhousie Ward
William Hill, Dalhousie Ward
E. G. Laverdure, Ottawa Ward
Donald T. Masson, Victoria  Ward
William Dowler Morris, Central Ward
Thomas Payment, By Ward
Joseph Rowan, By Ward (elected c. June)
Michael Starrs, By Ward (resigned June 15)
Robert Stewart, Wellington Ward
Edward Wallace, Central Ward

1895
 
William Borthwick, mayor
Basil H. Bell, Rideau Ward
William Campbell, Wellington Ward
Napoleon Champagne, Ottawa Ward
Fred Cook, Central Ward
George Dalglish, Victoria Ward
Robert Davidson, Dalhousie Ward
Samuel J. Davis, Wellington Ward
J. C. Enright, Victoria Ward
George Forde, Rdieau Ward
John Gleeson, By Ward
John C. Grant, St. George Ward
George M. Greene, Central Ward
Robert Hastey, St. George Ward
J. C. Jamieson, Dalhousie Ward
E. E. Lauzon, Ottawa Ward
E. G. Laverdure, Ottawa Ward
F. H. Martelock, Rideau Ward
Terrence McGuire, Dalhousie Ward
Donald T. Masson, Victoria  Ward
William Dowler Morris, Central Ward
Thomas Payment, By Ward
Michael Starrs, By Ward
Robert Stewart, Wellington Ward
Edward Wallace, Central Ward

1894

George Cox, mayor
F. R. E. Campeau, St. George Ward
William Campbell, Wellington Ward
Napoleon Champagne, Ottawa Ward
William Cluff, Central Ward
Fred Cook, Central Ward
J. A. Corry, Wellington Ward
Robert Davidson, Dalhousie Ward
A. D. Fraser, Victoria Ward
James D. Fraser, Rideau Ward
Joseph Gareau, By Ward
John Gleeson, By Ward
George M. Greene, Central Ward
Joseph Hawken, Rideau Ward
J. C. Jamieson, Dalhousie Ward
E. G. Laverdure, Ottawa Ward
Alex MacLean, Victoria Ward
Terrence McGuire, Dalhousie Ward
William Dowler Morris, Central Ward
J. L. Olivier, Ottawa Ward
J. H. Parnell, St. George Ward
John C. Roger, Rideau Ward
David Scott, Victoria Ward
Michael Starrs, By Ward
Robert Stewart, Wellington Ward

1893

Olivier Durocher, mayor
William Ashe, Wellington Ward 
S. W. H. Baldwin, St. George Ward
Samuel Bingham, Ottawa Ward
William Campbell, Wellington Ward
F. R. E. Campeau, St. George Ward
John Casey, By Ward 
Napoleon Champagne, Ottawa Ward
J. A. Corry, Wellington Ward
James D. Fraser, Rideau Ward
Joseph Gareau, By Ward
John C. Grant, St. George Ward
George M. Greene, Central Ward
Joseph Hawken, Rideau Ward
Stuart Alexander Henderson, Central Ward
J. C. Jamieson, Dalhousie Ward
Alex MacLean, Victoria Ward
Donald Mason, Victoria Ward
Terrence McGuire, Dalhousie Ward
J. L. Olivier, Ottawa Ward
James Peterkin, Dalhousie Ward
John C. Roger, Rideau Ward
David Scott, Victoria Ward
Michael Starrs, By Ward
Edward Wallace, Central Ward

1892

Olivier Durocher, mayor
William Ashe, Wellington Ward 
S. W. H. Baldwin, St. George Ward
Samuel Bingham, Ottawa Ward
William Campbell, Wellington Ward
Napoleon Champagne, Ottawa Ward 
William Cluff, Central Ward
Levi Crannel, Victoria Ward
C. R. Cunningham, Victoria Ward
Edward Devlin, By Ward
George Forde, Rideau Ward
James D. Fraser, Rideau Ward
Joseph Gareau, By Ward
Joseph Hawken, Rideau Ward
William H. Hewlett, Dalhousie Ward
William Hill, Dalhousie Ward
T. Lemay, Ottawa Ward
William Dowler Morris, Central Ward
John O'Leary, St. George Ward 
James Peterkin, Dalhousie Ward
Charles Scrim, Wellington Ward
Michael Starrs, By Ward
J. K. Stewart, Victoria Ward
William R. Stroud, St. George Ward
Edward Wallace, Central Ward

1891

Thomas Birkett, mayor
Samuel Bingham, Ottawa Ward
William Borthwick, St. George Ward
C. S. O. Boudreault, Ottawa Ward
E. B. Butterworth, Central Ward
William Campbell, Wellington Ward
George Cox, Central Ward
Edward Devlin, By Ward
Olivier Durocher, Ottawa Ward
James D. Fraser, Rideau Ward
A. Grant, Wellington Ward
John Henderson, Rideau Ward
William H. Hewlett, Dalhousie Ward
William Hill, Dalhousie Ward
William H. Hutchison, Victoria Ward
W. J. Johnstone, Victoria Ward
E. G. Laverdure, By Ward
John O'Leary, St. George Ward
John C. Roger, Rideau Ward 
A. Savard, By Ward
Charles Scrim, Wellington Ward
J. K. Stewart, Victoria Ward
William R. Stroud, St. George Ward
R. Thackray, Dalhousie Ward
James Wallace, Central Ward

1890

Jacob Erratt, mayor
John Askwith, Rideau Ward
G. Baptie, Central Ward
Samuel Bingham, Ottawa Ward
William Borthwick, St. George Ward
E. B. Butterworth, Central Ward
William Campbell, Wellington Ward
Levi Crannell, Dalhousie Ward
Olivier Durocher, Ottawa Ward
William Hill, Dalhousie Ward
F. G. Farrell, By Ward
James Gordon, Victoria Ward
John Henderson, Rideau Ward
John Heney, By Ward 
William H. Hutchison, Victoria Ward
William Johnstone, Victoria Ward 
E. G. Laverdure, By Ward
Alex MacLean, Wellington Ward
H. C. Monk, Central Ward
Thomas Raphael, St. George Ward
A. D. Richard, Ottawa Ward
David Scott, Dalhousie Ward
Charles Scrim, Wellington Ward
William R. Stroud, St. George Ward
Thomas Tubman, Rideau Ward

1889

Jacob Erratt, mayor
John Askwith, Rideau Ward
George Baptie, Central Ward
Samuel Bingham, Ottawa Ward
William Borthwick, St. George Ward
E. B. Butterworth, Central Ward
William Campbell, Wellington Ward
Levi Crannell, Dalhousie Ward
George Dalglish, Victoria Ward 
Olivier Durocher, Ottawa Ward
F. J. Farrell, By Ward
James Gordon, Victoria Ward
John Henderson, Rideau Ward
John Heney, By Ward
William Hill, Dalhousie Ward 
William H. Hutchison, Victoria Ward
Oliver Latour, Ottawa Ward
E. G. Laverdure, By Ward
Alex MacLean, Wellington Ward
H. C. Monk, Central Ward
John O'Leary, St. George Ward
John C. Roger, Rideau Ward
David Scott, Dalhousie Ward
Charles Scrim, Wellington Ward
William R. Stroud, St. George Ward

1888

McLeod Stewart, mayor
A. A. Adam, Ottawa Ward
John Askwith, New Edinburgh Ward
Samuel Bingham, Ottawa Ward
William Borthwick, St. George Ward
George Cox, Wellington Ward
George Dalglish, Victoria Ward 
Olivier Durocher, Ottawa Ward
Jacob Erratt, St. George Ward
James Gordon, Victoria Ward
John Henderson, New Edinburgh Ward
John Heney, By Ward
William H. Hutchison, Victoria Ward
A. C. Larose, By Ward
E. G. Laverdure, By Ward
Taylor McVeity, Wellington Ward
H. C. Monk, Wellington Ward
John O'Leary, St. George Ward
John C. Roger, New Edinburgh Ward

City Halls

 First City Hall (Ottawa) 1849–1877 – now site of National Arts Centre
 Second City Hall (Ottawa) 1877–1931
 Transportation Building (Ottawa) 1931–1958
 John G. Diefenbaker Building 1958–2000
 Ottawa City Hall 2000–

See also

 List of Ottawa municipal elections
 Ottawa Board of Control
 List of mayors of Ottawa
 Regional Municipality of Ottawa-Carleton

References

External links
 City of Ottawa City Hall

Municipal government of Ottawa
Municipal councils in Ontario